The 2001–2002 LEB season was the 6th season of the Liga Española de Baloncesto, second tier of the Spanish basketball.

LEB standings

LEB Oro Playoffs
The two winners of the semifinals are promoted to Liga ACB.

Relegation playoffs

Cajasur and Llobregat Centre, relegated to LEB-2.

TV coverage
TVE2
Teledeporte

References
All scores on FEB.es

See also 
Liga Española de Baloncesto

LEB Oro seasons
LEB2
Second level Spanish basketball league seasons